Polina Sergeevna Khonina (born December 15, 1998, in Kirov, Russia) is a retired Russian individual rhythmic gymnast. She is now working as a coach and have coached gymnasts from national team of Korea, Hong Kong and Denmark.

Personal life 
Polina's idols in rhythmic gymnastics are Yevgeniya Kanayeva and Margarita Mamun. Her favourite gymnasts during her childhood were Oxana Kostina, Kateryna Serebrianska and Larissa Loukianenko. Her favourite apparatus is a ball. Polina always wanted to become a trainer in rhythmic gymnastics. She is the Master of Sports of International Class.

Career 
Khonina was a member of the Russian National Reserve Team since 2014, and was moved to the Russian National Team in 2018.

She won all-around in the Russian Rhythmic Gymnastics Cup in 2016.

She finished 9th in the all-around at the 2016 Russian Championships and 4th at the 2017 Russian Championships. 
She won the bronze medal in clubs and the bronze medal in ribbon at the 2017 Russian Championships.

Khonina made her breakthrough in the 2017 Season. She won two bronze medals at the 2017 Russian Championships with clubs and ribbon.

She debuted in the Grand Prix series at the 2017 Kiev Grand Prix where she won the all-around gold medal ahead of teammate Iuliia Bravikova, she also qualified to all apparatus finals winning 3 silver medals in ribbon, clubs, ball and finished 4th in hoop.

On June 2–4 Khonina competed at her first World Challenge Cup at the 2017 Guadalajara World Cup where she won the gold medal in the all-around ahead of teammate Ekaterina Selezneva, she qualified to all apparatus finals taking gold medals in ball, clubs, finished 4th in ribbon and 8th in hoop.

On June 23–25 Khonina competed at the 2017 Grand Prix Holon finishing 5th in the all-around. On October 20–22 she competed at the 2017 Brno Grand Prix where she won the silver medal in the all-around and she also qualified to all apparatus finals winning 3 silver medals in hoop, ball and clubs and the bronze medal in ribbon.

In 2018, Khonina started the season with a competition at the 2018 Moscow Grand Prix finishing 7th in the all-around behind Japan's Sumire Kita, she qualified into the clubs and ribbon finals. On March March 24–25, Khonina finished 8th in the all-around at the 2018 Thiais Grand Prix. On May 11–13, Khonina competed at the 2018 Portimao World Challenge Cup where she won bronze in the all-around behind Nicol Zelikman, she qualified in all apparatus finals taking 2 silver in medals with ball, clubs, a bronze with hoop and finished 5th in ribbon.

Routine music information

References

External links 
 
 Polina Khonina profile 
 

1998 births
Living people
Russian rhythmic gymnasts
Sportspeople from Kirov, Kirov Oblast
21st-century Russian women